International Black Sea Club is an international non-governmental organisation uniting several cities on the Black Sea and in its vicinity. It has the status of Observer in the Black Sea Economic Cooperation organisation and the special Consultative Status with the United Nations Economic and Social Council. It was created in 1992 in Odesa, Ukraine and its current president is Ionut Pucheanu, the mayor of Galati City (Romania).

Members 
30 cities from 10 countries of Black Sea region are members of IBSC, such as:
 - Burgas, Varna;
 - Poti, Batumi, Sokhumi (capital of );
 - Piraeus, Thessaloniki, Kavala;
 - Tiraspol (capital of );
 - Constanţa, Galaţi;
 - Azov, Taganrog, Rostov on Don, Tuapse, Anapa, Temryuk District;
 - Trabzon, Samsun, Izmit;
 - Odesa, Mykolaiv, Sevastopol, Chornomorsk, Kherson, Yuzhny, Mariupol, Yalta, Feodosiya.

References

International economic organizations
Black Sea organizations